Frederick, Duke of Saxe-Hildburghausen (29 April 1763 in Hildburghausen – 29 September 1834 in Altenburg), was duke of Saxe-Hildburghausen (1780–1826) and duke of Saxe-Altenburg (1826–1834).

Biography
He was the youngest child, but only son, of Ernst Frederick III, Duke of Saxe-Hildburghausen, by his third wife, Princess Ernestine of Saxe-Weimar.

Succession
Frederick succeeded his father Duke of Saxe-Hildburghausen in 1780, when only seventeen years old; because of this, his great grand uncle, the prince Joseph of Saxe-Hildburghausen, assumed the regency on his behalf, this regency only ended in 1787 at the death of Prince Joseph.

Until 1806 he was subject to the restrictions of the imperial debit commission, which had placed the duchy of Saxe-Hildburghausen under official administration, because of his predecessors' dissolute financial policy. In 1806 Frederick joined the Confederation of the Rhine, and in 1815 the German Confederation, under whose guarantee he gave 1818 the duchy a new basic condition.

Marriage and issue
In Hildburghausen on 3 September 1785, Frederick married Duchess Charlotte Georgine of Mecklenburg-Strelitz. She was a niece of Charlotte of Mecklenburg-Strelitz, who was the wife of King George III. Two of her sisters later became the queens of Prussia and Hanover, respectively. They had twelve children:
 Joseph Georg Karl Frederick (b. Hildburghausen, 12 June 1786 – d. Hildburghausen, 30 July 1786).
 Katharina Charlotte Georgine Fredericka Sofie Therese (b. Hildburghausen, 17 June 1787 – d. Bamberg, 12 December 1847), married on 28 September 1805 to Prince Paul of Württemberg.
 Caroline Auguste (b. and d. Hildburghausen, 29 July 1788).
 Joseph Georg Friedrich Ernst Karl, Duke of Saxe-Altenburg (b. Hildburghausen, 27 August 1789 – d. Altenburg, 25 November 1868).
  Fredericke Luise Marie Caroline Auguste Christiane (b. Hildburghausen, 18 January 1791 – d. Hildburghausen, 25 March 1791).
 Therese Charlotte Luise Friederike Amalie (b. Hildburghausen, 8 July 1792 – d. Munich, 26 October 1854), married on 12 October 1810 to King Ludwig I of Bavaria.
 Charlotte Luise Fredericka Amalie Alexandrine (b. Hildburghausen, 28 January 1794 – d. Biebrich, 6 April 1825), married on 24 June 1813 to Wilhelm, Duke of Nassau.
 Franz Frederick Karl Ludwig Georg Heinrich (b. Hildburghausen, 13 April 1795 – d. Hildburghausen, 28 May 1800).
 Georg, Duke of Saxe-Altenburg (b. Hildburghausen, 24 July 1796 – d. Hummelshain, 3 August 1853).
 Frederick Wilhelm Karl Joseph Ludwig Georg (b. Hildburghausen, 4 October 1801 – d. Altenburg, 1 July 1870).
 Maximilian Karl Adolf Heinrich (b. Hildburghausen, 19 February 1803 – d. Hildburghausen, 29 March 1803).
 Eduard Karl Wilhelm Christian (b. Hildburghausen, 3 July 1804 – d. Munich, 16 May 1852).

Frederick was considered popular and intelligent. During his reign, along with his beautiful wife, Charlotte, cultural life in the small town reached its zenith. So many poets and artists spent their time there that Hildburghausen was nicknamed "Klein-Weimar" (Little Weimar). When the last duke of Saxe-Gotha-Altenburg died without issue in 1825, the other branches of the house decided on a rearrangement of the Ernestine duchies. On 12 November 1826, Frederick became Duke of Saxe-Altenburg, to which he gave a first Basic Law in the year 1831; in exchange, he ceded Saxe-Hildburghausen to the Duke of Saxe-Meiningen.

Ancestry

References

External links
 

1763 births
1834 deaths
People from Saxe-Altenburg
People from Hildburghausen
House of Saxe-Hildburghausen
Dukes of Saxe-Hildburghausen
Dukes of Saxe-Altenburg
Generals of the Holy Roman Empire